Ikuko Fukita (born 14 May 1972) is a Japanese softball player. She competed in the women's tournament at the 1996 Summer Olympics.

References

1972 births
Living people
Japanese softball players
Olympic softball players of Japan
Softball players at the 1996 Summer Olympics
Place of birth missing (living people)